Jewish temple may refer to:

Jewish temple or Jewish Temple, may refer to the Temples in Jerusalem
The First Temple, destroyed by the Neo-Babylonian Empire in 586 BC
The Second Temple, destroyed by the Roman Empire in 70 AD
The Third Temple, based on a futuristic prophecy
Jewish temple has also been used to describe temples located in Ancient Egypt
The temple in Elephantine 
The temple in Leontopolis
The term may also refer to places called "House of Yahweh"
A synagogue, a Jewish house of worship

See also
Tel Motza temple
Samaritan Temple on Mount Gerizim

Jewish theology
Tabernacle and Temples in Jerusalem